"My Number One" is a song recorded by Greek-Swedish singer Helena Paparizou, written by Manos Psaltakis, Christos Dantis, Natalia Germanou and produced by Christos Dantis.

The song is notable for casting elements of traditional Greek music in a contemporary dance music setting: its arrangement includes bouzoukis and a solo featuring a Cretan lyra. The song's lyrics describe the singer's appreciation for her lover who is lauded as her "number one" and "the only treasure [she]'ll ever have".

In 2022, newspaper The Independent named it 29th best Eurovision-winning song of all time.

Background and composition
"My Number One" was written by Manos Psaltakis, Christos Dantis and Natalia Germanou, and produced by Dantis. The composition had initially been credited to Dantis, however, a 2013 lawsuit by musician Manos Psaltakis resulted in the credit being assigned to Psaltakis.

After the release of "My Number One", a Swedish album followed which contained "My Number One" and in Greece Paparizou re-released her first album Protereotita featuring "My Number One" and the other songs in the running for Eurovision pre-selection. It has sold over 90,000 copies in Greece and was certified double platinum.

In early 2006, it was announced that "My Number One" and "Mambo!" would be remixed and released in the United States by Moda Records. On August 22, a maxi CD single was released to record stores, featuring 10 remixes, and the original song; the mixes were also released as digital downloads on 4 June.

Reception
After the Eurovision victory, the video for the song was released in several countries throughout Europe. It went to #1 in both Greece and Paparizou's native Sweden for 4 weeks and was certified gold in both countries. The song was played constantly in Greece all through the summer. The success of the single is credited to the popular remix from Chris "The Greek" Panaghi which Sony (Greece) commissioned for the remix.

The song peaked on the Billboard Hot Dance Club Play chart at number 8 and number 25 on the Billboard Hot Dance Singles Sales. In September 2006, the Georgie’s #1 Radio Anthem Mix was added to popular American retailer Abercrombie & Fitch's store playlist nationwide.

Music video and promotion

The music video of "My Number One" premiered in the US in 2006. There were two separate videos. One is the original video, that was also shown in Europe. The second is a re-edited version of the same video, to the beat of the Josh Harris Remix from the CD Single.

Eurovision Song Contest

Song selection
Before Eurovision, Greek national broadcaster ERT used an internal selection method to choose Paparizou. They then had composers submit songs for her to perform, among which four were picked ("My Number One", "OK", "Let's Get Wild" and "The Light in Our Soul").

At the Greek national selection, the public would see Paparizou perform each of the songs and vote their favourite via televoting to a special jury, which would determine what song to send to Eurovision. Shortly before the Greek national selection, it was revealed that "The Light in Our Soul" had been released by the artist Big Alice in Germany, thus being disqualified for breaching the rules, leaving out only three songs. The chorus of the winning track had already become a chant for AEK Athens supporters.

The voting to pick the song consisted of televoting, and a jury. Televoting held a 60% outcome to the song, and the jury held a 40% outcome. In the end, "My Number One" gained a combined 66.47% from televoting and jury votes, and was chosen to represent Greece in 2005 Eurovision Song Contest. Shortly after the song was picked, the music video was shot in just 1 day at the Thessaloniki Science Center and Technology Museum in Thessaloniki.

After the song was picked, Paparizou went on a European promotional tour. Paparizou visited over 20 countries on her tour, and sang on various TV shows, as well as gave many interviews. This method proved popular, and was used by many countries in 2006, including by Greece again in 2006.

In Kyiv
As Greece had finished the Eurovision Song Contest 2004 in third place, the song was pre-qualified for the final in 2005. Thus, it was performed nineteenth on the night, following 's Boris Novković and LADO with "Vukovi umiru sami" and preceding 's Natalia Podolskaya with "Nobody Hurt No One".

During the performance, Paparizou did a stage show of the song. Some of the best remembered visuals from the show include her dancing a traditional Greek Pontian dance, the 4 dancers making the shape on the number 1 of the floor (showed from aerial camera) and her playing an imaginary lyra while her dancers pick her up. At the close of voting, it had received 230 points, finishing at the head of a 24-strong field.

At the Congratulations special in late 2005, the song was named as one of the five greatest contest entries of all time, earning the 4th place in ESC history.

"My Number One" held two other Eurovision records:
 The first one is that it scored an average of only 6.05 points per jury, the lowest average for a winning song at the time.
 The second is that it was the record for most sets of 12 points given out to one country. "My Number One" received 12 points 10 times, tying it with the 's  entry "Love Shine a Light" by Katrina and the Waves for the record (televoting was only in place for 5 countries at the time).

After Greece won Eurovision, a mass party started on the streets of Athens. People went out onto the streets with Greek flags, and started singing "My Number One", as well as honking car horns. This was similar to when Greece won Euro 2004, the 2005 Eurobasket title and when Greece won the silver medal in the 2006 FIBA World Championship. When Paparizou arrived back to Greece from Kyiv, mass crowds met her at the Athens International Airport, where she held up a Greek flag and the trophy.

Use in media
In 2009, "My Number One" made its way to the PlayStation 3 karaoke game Singstar as downloadable content. It was previously released in the Swedish version of the game, but it is the first time it has become accessible to players from all over Europe.
A part of this song was sampled for "Thara Thara Onthara" of Kannada-language film Bindaas.

Cover versions
In 2006, the heavy metal band Dream Evil recorded a tongue-in-cheek cover of the song for their album United.

Track listings

International edition
"My Number One"–2:58
"I Don't Want You Here Anymore"–4:09

German edition
"My Number One"–2:58
"I Don't Want You Here Anymore"–4:09
"O.K."–2:58
"My Number One" (Music video)

Swedish edition
"My Number One"–2:58
"My Number One" (Instrumental)–2:58
	
US edition
"Josh Harris Radio Mix"–3:38
"Norty Cotto's My Radio Lover Mix"–3:29
"Original Radio"–2:55
"Georgie's #1 Radio Anthem Mix"–3:18
"Mike Cruz Radio Mix"–4:03
"Chris "The Greek" Panaghi Radio Mix"–3:35
"Valentino's Radio Epic Mix"–3:02
"Josh Harris Vocal Club Mix"–6:53
"Norty Cotto's My Clubber Lover Mix"–6:57
"Georgie's #1 Anthem Mix"–7:00
"Mike Cruz Vox Mix"–9:44

Credits and personnel
Credits adapted from liner notes.
Locations
Recorded at Vox Studios (Athens, Greece)

Personnel
Christina Argyri vocals
Aris Binissound engineer, production assistant
Christos Dantis arrangement, production, songwriting
Christos Ekmetzoglou Pontian lyra
Natalia Germanou songwriting
Panayiotis Gotsis Cretan lyra
Yannis Ioannidis mastering
Katerina Kyriakou vocals
Yannis Lionakis bouzouki
Alex Panayi vocals
Helena Paparizou lead vocals
Petros Parashis artwork
Christos Prendoulis photography
Manos Psaltakis songwriting
Petros Siakavellas mastering

Charts and certifications

Charts

Year-end charts

Certifications

Release history

References

External links
 Chart History in Billboard

Eurovision songs of Greece
Eurovision songs of 2005
Congratulations Eurovision songs
Helena Paparizou songs
2005 singles
2006 singles
MAD Video Music Award for Best Female Artist
Music videos directed by Kostas Kapetanidis
Songs written by Christos Dantis
Eurovision Song Contest winning songs
Number-one singles in Greece
Number-one singles in Sweden
English-language Greek songs
Songs with lyrics by Natalia Germanou
2005 songs
Sony BMG singles
Columbia Records singles